Ben Mosley (born 9 August 1981) is a British expressionist artist whose work is based on architectural and sporting themes. He is currently official artist for Team GB and Artist in Residence at Wembley Stadium. 

From Baldock in Hertfordshire, Mosley was educated at The Knights Templar School in his home town of Baldock. He took a BTEC Diploma Art Foundation course at the University of Hertfordshire (1998-1999) and a BA Honours Fine Art Degree at the University of Liverpool (2000-2003). Mosley specialises in live painting, and is considered to be one of Great Britains leading artists in that genre. He uses lots of real 24k gold in his work and creates paintings from a blank canvas to completion at high profile sporting events and charitable dinners in a matter of hours in front of live audiences. His live painting at high profile black tie dinners with celebrities such as Ed Sheeran have seen him raise large sums for various charities over the last decade. His record sale being 66k to date. Mosley is also an accomplished muralist, having completed murals for Team GB and Wembley Stadium. His largest mural to date resides at Barnsley Football Club, which stretches 60metres down the south stand concourse at Oakwell Stadium. He has received commissions from many leading organisations connected within sport including Wembley Stadium, Manchester United, and McDonald's (for whom he created his artwork 'Fans of the World' which was transferred on to McDonald’s iconic fries packaging in a global promotions seen by an estimated 60 million people worldwide), the London Olympics, and The Emirates and Creek Golf clubs in Dubai. His most famous commission to date was by Hello! Magazine, When he was officially commissioned in 2022 to create a painting of her late majesty Queen Elizabeth 11 in celebration of her platinum Jubilee. Collectors and supporters of his work include Mike Tindall and Zara Tindall, Ed Sheeran,Sir Alex Ferguson, Wayne Rooney, José Mourinho and Hollywood director  Jerry Weintraub. Mosley’s work can be found in many private collections around the world.

Mosley's first exhibition as a professional artist was at the Manchester Art Show in 2003 since then he has had solo exhibitions at various venues in London and has shown his work at the coveted Saatchi Gallery in 2022. He was the first artist to paint a mural at Wembley Stadium which was designed to show the transition from the old Wembley Stadium to the new Wembley Stadium depicting the ground's history from 1923 and which covers an area of 20m. As Artist in Residence at the home of football, Mosley has forty paintings displayed in a permanent collection at Club Wembley. Mosley is currently official artist for  Team GB] having created a medal moments mural in Carnaby street in London celebrating every medal won by Team GB at the Tokyo Olympics. He's also going to be working with Team GB in Paris 2024.

References

External links
Mosley's Profile on Saatchi Art
Ben Mosley: the footballers’ artist - Skylark Gallery

1981 births
Living people
People from Baldock
Alumni of the University of Hertfordshire
Alumni of the University of Liverpool
British illustrators
English illustrators
English male painters
21st-century English painters
English contemporary artists
People educated at The Knights Templar School, Baldock
21st-century English male artists